Marvin Lee Harriott (born 20 April 1974) is an English former professional footballer who played as a full back.

Career
Harriott spent the 1992–93 season with Luton Town, and after a brief spell with Barnsley, joined Bristol City, where he made 36 appearances in the Football League. Harriott later played for Grays Athletic, Cardiff City, Aylesbury, Gloucester City, Scarborough and Kingstonian.

Harriott also participated at the 1993 FIFA World Youth Championship, making five appearances in the tournament.

References

1974 births
Living people
English footballers
Luton Town F.C. players
Barnsley F.C. players
Bristol City F.C. players
Grays Athletic F.C. players
Cardiff City F.C. players
Aylesbury F.C. players
Scarborough F.C. players
Kingstonian F.C. players
English Football League players
Gloucester City A.F.C. players
Association football defenders